Agnes Larson (15 March 1892 – 24 January 1957) was an American local historian.

Life and work
Agnes Matilda Larson was born in Preston, Minnesota on 15 March 1892, sister of Henrietta Larson. She attended St. Olaf College, graduating with a B.A. in history and English. Larson taught high school in Walcott, North Dakota and Northfield, Minnesota and studied social work at the University of Chicago in the summer. She was awarded her M.A. by Columbia University in 1922 and she began teaching at Mankato State Teachers College. Larson started teaching at St. Olaf in 1926 and she received another M.A. from Radcliffe College in 1929. Two years later she was awarded a fellowship by the American Association of University Women and she studied the white pine industry in Minnesota with Frederick Merk at Harvard University. The following year, she returned to Northfield to work on her thesis and catalog for the Norwegian-American Historical Association. Larson received her doctorate in 1938 and served as chair of the history department from 1942 to 1960, writing History of the White Pine Industry in Minnesota. Just before her death on 24 January 1957, she finished John A. Johnson: An Uncommon American.

Notes

References

1892 births
St. Olaf College alumni
University of Chicago School of Social Service Administration alumni
Columbia University alumni
20th-century American historians
Radcliffe College alumni
1957 deaths
American women historians
People from Preston, Minnesota
Writers from Minnesota
20th-century American women writers
Historians from Minnesota
Minnesota State University, Mankato faculty